Christiana Erotokritou (born 24 May 1973) is a Cypriot politician and lawyer. Since 2016, he has been a member of the House of Representatives of Cyprus.

Erotokritou grew up in Nicosia and graduated from the English School in 1991. She studied law at the University of Wolverhampton and obtained the title of Barrister at Law at Lincoln's Inn in London. Since her youth, she has been a part of the Democratic Party.

Since 2003, she has been elected to the Democratic Party Executive Office, and since 2013 has been appointed Party Spokesperson, a post he held until 2016.

In the parliamentary elections of 2016, she was elected lawmaker for Nicosia District with Democratic Party. As a Member, she is a member of the Selection Committee, a member of the Parliamentary Committee on Human Rights and Equal Opportunities for Men and Women, the Parliamentary Committee on Foreign and European Affairs, the Parliamentary Committee on Legal Affairs, the Ad Hoc Parliamentary Committee on the Compliance of the Parliament's Rules of Procedure and an alternate of the Special Parliamentary Committee on the Middle East. She is also an alternate member of the Parliament delegation to the Parliamentary Assembly of the Council of Europe.

In 2018, in DIKO's internal elections was elected deputy chairman of the party.

References

1973 births
Living people
Cypriot women lawyers
People from Nicosia
20th-century Cypriot lawyers
21st-century Cypriot women politicians
21st-century Cypriot politicians
Members of the House of Representatives (Cyprus)
Democratic Party (Cyprus) politicians
Members of the Parliamentary Assembly of the Council of Europe